Garik Sephkhanyan  (born on August 13, 1983), is an Armenian actor and screenwriter. He is known for his role as barmen and cafe waiter Ruben on Full House (Armenian TV series), Garik on Yere1. He is also a screenwriter of Full House. He is married with Syune Hambardzumyan

Filmography

External links

References

1983 births
Living people
Male actors from Yerevan
Armenian male film actors
21st-century Armenian screenwriters
21st-century Armenian male actors